The Blue Hour is a 1953 West German comedy film directed by Veit Harlan and starring Kristina Söderbaum, Hans Nielsen and Kurt Kreuger. Production began on the film in October 1952. It was shot at the Göttingen Studios and on location on the island of Capri. The film's sets were designed by the art director Walter Haag. Because of public protests against his wartime role as a Nazi filmmaker, Harlan considered turning over the project to his colleague Geza von Bolvary but eventually decided to direct it himself.

It was the third film of a post-war comeback for the husband and wife team Harlan and Söderbaum, but was much less commercially successful than the two previous films the melodramas Immortal Beloved and Hanna Amon.

Cast
 Kristina Söderbaum as Angelika
 Hans Nielsen as Paul
 Kurt Kreuger as Dulong
 Paulette Andrieux as Lou
 Harald Juhnke as Fred
 Renate Feuereisen as Mariechen
 Jakob Tiedtke as Portier
 Otto Gebühr as Geheimrat Jordan
 Charlotte Scheier-Herold
 Esther Gramsch
 Hans Hermann Schaufuß

References

Bibliography 
 Noack, Frank. Veit Harlan: The Life and Work of a Nazi Filmmaker. University Press of Kentucky, 2016.

External links 
 

1953 films
West German films
German comedy films
1953 comedy films
1950s German-language films
Films directed by Veit Harlan
1950s German films
Films shot at Göttingen Studios